Queensmead School Windsor was a Catholic non-selective private day school for boys and girls aged 2 to 18 in Windsor, Berkshire, England, located at the edge of Windsor Great Park. Despite its religious affiliation, the school accepted pupils of all faiths. The school was closed on 31 January 2019 after attempts to sell it to an overseas education provider were unsuccessful.

History
The Brigidine Sisters established a convent and school at Windsor in 1948, the second such founded by the order in England and Wales. Queensmead, the Victorian bricked mansion the Sisters moved into, remained  one of the school's main buildings. The school became run by lay staff but retained its Catholic ethos and religious character.

During the early 2000s, the school experienced financial difficulties; pupil and staff numbers declined and the school was threatened with closure. In 2011 parents and governors discussed a possibility of the school entering the state sector but an agreement could not be reached.

In 2012, further funding was secured and the school remained open and independent.

In 2018 it was renamed from Brigidine to Queensmead.

Closure
After years of financial difficulties, the school closed permanently on 31 January 2019.

At the time of closure, the Head of Education was Simon Larter, and the Head of Business Affairs Dawn Fleming.

Alumni
Tamara Mellon, fashion designer
Susan Sheridan, actress

See also
 Catholic Church in England

References

External links
Official website
Ofsted Report 2009 (as Brigidine School)
Profile on the ISC website

Girls' schools in Berkshire
Educational institutions established in 1948
Defunct schools in the Royal Borough of Windsor and Maidenhead
Educational institutions disestablished in 2019
Defunct Catholic schools in the Diocese of Portsmouth
1948 establishments in England
Brigidine schools
2019 disestablishments in England